The following is a timeline of the history of the city of Norman, Oklahoma, United States.

Prior to 20th century

 1889 – Norman Transcript newspaper begins publication.
 1890
 Norman designated seat of newly created Cleveland County.
 High Gate College established.
 Population: 787.
 1891 – City of Norman incorporated.
 1892 – University of Oklahoma opens.
 1893 – Griffin Memorial Hospital established.
 1895 – Central State Hospital established.
 1899 – University's Natural History Museum established.
 1900 – University's School of Geology founded.

20th century

 1907 – Norman becomes part of the new U.S. state of Oklahoma.
 1909 – Norman Depot built.
 1913 – Oklahoma Railway Company interurban train begins operating.
 1915 – Oklahoma State Asylum active.
 1918 – "Fire at State Hospital."
 1920 – Population: 5,004.
 1922 – WNAD radio begins broadcasting.
 1923 – University's Memorial Stadium opens.
 1924 – McFarlin Methodist Church built.
 1929 – Sooner Theatre built.
 1939 – Cleveland County Courthouse built.
 1940 – Population: 11,429.
 1942 – U.S. military Naval Air Technical Training Center and Naval Flight Training Center established during World War II.
 1946 – Norman Municipal Hospital established.
 1950 – Rancho Drive-in cinema in business.
 1967 – Cleveland County Historical Society incorporated.
 1970 – Population: 52,117.
 1975 – Cleveland County Historical Society Museum established.
 1981 – York International manufacturing plant in business.
 1987 – Japan-based Hitachi, Ltd. manufacturing plant in business.
 1997 – City website online (approximate date).

21st century

 2003
 Japan-based Astellas Pharma Inc. office in business.
 Tom Cole becomes U.S. representative for Oklahoma's 4th congressional district.
 2010 – Population: 110,925.
 2016 – Lynne Miller becomes mayor.
 2020 – adopted new flag after flag redesign contest.

See also
 Norman, Oklahoma history
 List of mayors of Norman, Oklahoma
 History of Cleveland County, Oklahoma
 List of Cleveland County, Oklahoma tornadoes
 National Register of Historic Places listings in Cleveland County, Oklahoma
 Timelines of other cities in Oklahoma: Oklahoma City, Tulsa

References

Bibliography

 
 
 John Womack. Norman: An Early History, 1820–1900 (Norman, Okla.: Privately printed, 1976).
 John Womack. Cleveland County, Oklahoma: Historical Highlights (Noble, Okla.: Privately printed, 1983).
 Bonnie Speer. Cleveland County: Pride of the Promised Land: An Illustrated History (Norman, Okla.: Traditional Publishers, 1988).

External links

 Items related to Norman, Oklahoma, various dates (via Digital Public Library of America)

Norman, Oklahoma
norman
norman
Years in Oklahoma